Kelli Maroney is an American film and television actress. She appeared in the films Fast Times at Ridgemont High (1982), Night of the Comet (1984), and Chopping Mall (1986), and also appeared on television in the soap operas Ryan's Hope and One Life to Live.

Career
Maroney's best-known film roles are Cindy Carr in Fast Times at Ridgemont High (1982), Samantha Belmont in Night of the Comet (1984), Jamie in The Zero Boys (1985), and Allison in Chopping Mall (1986).
Her daytime TV roles were as Kimberly Harris Beaulac on the soap opera Ryan's Hope (1979–1983) and Tina Lord on One Life to Live (1984–1985).

Appearances
She has made numerous guest appearances on TV shows, among them True Blood, Family Feud, Simon & Simon, Murder, She Wrote, FBI: The Untold Stories, and Chicago Hope.

She was featured on the cover of People for a 1980 article titled: Torrid Teens on the Soaps (with actresses Genie Francis and Kristen Vigard).

Maroney appeared as a guest on the Playboy TV 2015 "So Sexy It's Scary" Halloween episode with Jeffrey Reddick and Lisa Wilcox.

She was a guest of and interviewed on Illeana Douglas's 2019 podcast "I Blame Dennis Hopper".

An interview with her is featured in the 2019 documentary Time Warp: The Greatest Cult Films of All-Time.

Filmography

References

External links

 
 

American film actresses
American soap opera actresses
American television actresses
Living people
1960 births
Actresses from Minnesota
21st-century American women